Otavaloa is a genus of South American cellar spiders that was first described by B. A. Huber in 2000.

Species
 it contains five species, found in Bolivia, Brazil, Peru, Ecuador, and Colombia:
Otavaloa angotero Huber, 2000 (type) – Colombia, Ecuador, Peru
Otavaloa lisei Huber, 2000 – Brazil
Otavaloa otanabe Huber, 2000 – Peru
Otavaloa pasco Huber, 2000 – Peru
Otavaloa piro Huber, 2000 – Peru, Bolivia

See also
 List of Pholcidae species

References

Araneomorphae genera
Pholcidae
Spiders of South America